Susan Jean Palmer is a Canadian sociologist of religion and author whose primary research interest is new religious movements. Formerly a professor of religious studies at Dawson College in Westmount, Quebec, she is currently an Affiliate Professor at Concordia University, and is also the Principal Investigator on the four-year SSHRC-funded research project, "Children in Sectarian Religions" at McGill University in Montreal, where she teaches courses on new religious movements.

Education
Palmer received a B.A. in Honours English at McGill University before she received her Masters and Ph.D in Religion from Concordia.

Work
She is best known for her 1994 book on gender issues, Moon Sisters, Krishna Mothers, Rajneesh Lovers: Women's Roles in New Religions.

She has engaged in field research with at least 30 different groups and is considered to be a leading authority on the Twelve Tribes communities, the Nuwaubian Nation and Raëlism.

Her topics range from apocalyptic activity, prophecy, charisma, communalism, childrearing, racialist religions, to research ethics and methods in studying new religions. Her article "Caught Up in the Cult Wars: Confessions of a Canadian Researcher"  has reappeared in several anthologies.

Her most recent work has focused on religious freedom issues. The New Heretics of France<ref>Palmer, Susan, The New Heretics of France, Minority Religions, la Republique, and the Government-Sponsored 'War on Sects' " New York: Oxford University Press</ref> explores the state-sponsored persecution of religious minorities, and The Nuwaubian Nation argues that Black Nationalist prophets in the US are targeted by networks of interest groups and rarely receive a fair trial.

Her book, Aliens Adored: Rael's UFO Religion, documents the formation and beliefs of the Raelian movement, with an eye to how scientific discoveries contribute to the formation of their human cloning theology.

Bibliography
 The Rajneesh Papers (with Arvind Sharma) (1993) Motilal Banarsidass Publishers  , 
 Moon Sisters, Krishna Mothers, Rajneesh Lovers: Women's Roles in New Religions (1994) Syracuse University Press , 
 Millennium, Messiahs, and Mayhem (with Thomas Robbins) (1997) Routledge , 
 Children in New Religions (with Charlotte E. Hardman) (1999) Rutgers University Press , 
 Aliens Adored: Rael's UFO Religion (2004)  Rutgers University Press , 
 The Nuwaubian Nation :  Black Spirituality and State Control (2010) Ashgate Publishing 
  The New Heretics of France, Minority Religions, la Republique, and the Government-Sponsored "War on Sects"  (in press June, 2011) Oxford University Press , 
  Storming Zion: Exploring State Raids on Religious Communities'' (with Stuart A. Wright) (2016) Oxford University Press

References

Canadian non-fiction writers
Researchers of new religious movements and cults
Canadian occult writers
1946 births
Living people
Canadian women non-fiction writers
Academic staff of Dawson College